Meg Heather Lees  (née Francis, born 19 October 1948) is a former member of the Australian Senate from 1990 to 2005, representing the state of South Australia. She represented the Australian Democrats from 1990 to 2002, and was her party's leader from 1997 – 2001. After being deposed by Natasha Stott Despoja, she quit the party to sit as an independent senator in 2002, adopting the party designation Australian Progressive Alliance from 2003 until her electoral defeat in 2005. As party leader, she controversially facilitated passage of the Howard Government's Goods and Services Tax (GST).

Family life
Lees was born in the Blue Mountains, west of Sydney. She became a teacher at Ingleburn High School and married Keith Lees, a fellow teacher, in about 1971.  In 1974 they moved to Mount Gambier, where their two daughters were born.  After both Keith and Meg became involved in the Australian Democrats, they moved to Adelaide, but the pressures of political activity led to the breakdown of their marriage.  On Christmas Eve 2000, shortly before she was deposed as the Democrats' leader in the Senate, Lees was remarried to Adelaide lawyer Matthew Mitchell.

Leadership of the Australian Democrats

Cheryl Kernot defected to the Australian Labor Party in October 1997, and Lees was called upon to stand in as acting leader. She was officially chosen as Kernot's replacement in December, with Natasha Stott Despoja becoming her deputy.

During her time as leader, the Democrats strengthened the Environment Protection and Biodiversity Act, improved the Pharmaceutical Benefits Scheme, negotiated the GST tax reform and maintained the general oversight role of the Democrats in the Senate through a number of Senate inquiries.

In 1999, Prime Minister John Howard proposed the idea of a Goods and Services Tax. It was opposed by the Labor Party, the Australian Greens and independent Senator Brian Harradine, which meant that it required Democrat support to pass. In an election fought on tax, the Democrats publicly stated that they liked neither the Liberal (GST) tax package or the Labor package, but pledged to work with whichever party was elected to make their tax package better. They campaigned with the slogan "No GST on food". A majority of the senators in the party room agreed to pass the bill if some amendments were made, mostly to exclude fresh food and essential items such as basic medicines. Stott Despoja stated that she was unhappy with the outcome, particularly the GST on books. Both Stott Despoja and Queensland Senator Andrew Bartlett ultimately crossed the floor to vote against the GST package.

However, a significant number of Democrat members remained unhappy with the GST deal, and began to agitate for a change in leadership. Under the Democrat constitution, a petition of 100 members can trigger a leadership ballot of all the members. On the initial ballot, Meg Lees was returned unchallenged. Subsequently, the Democrats faced a decline in the polls which, by April 2001, were indicating that several senators would lose their seats at the elections due for later that year. The members agitated again for a leadership ballot and, this time, Stott Despoja announced her intention to challenge Lees for the leadership, and was successful, replacing her on 6 April 2001.

In mid-2002, Lees began vocally opposing Stott Despoja's leadership, claiming that it had moved the party too far to the left. This culminated in Lees leaving the party to sit as an independent in July 2002.

Australian Progressive Alliance
In April 2003 Lees announced the founding of the Australian Progressive Alliance, which she claimed would have a more centrist view than the Democrats. However, she was defeated at the October 2004 election and her term expired on 30 June 2005.

References

External links
Meg Lees, Senate Biography

1948 births
Living people
Australian Democrats members of the Parliament of Australia
Independent members of the Parliament of Australia
Members of the Australian Senate
Members of the Australian Senate for South Australia
Women members of the Australian Senate
Australian Progressive Alliance members of the Parliament of Australia
Leaders of the Australian Democrats
Officers of the Order of Australia
21st-century Australian politicians
21st-century Australian women politicians
20th-century Australian politicians
20th-century Australian women politicians